Michael Scherer is an American journalist. He is currently a national political reporter for The Washington Post, covering the White House and Congress.

Education 
Scherer received a B.A. in literature from the University of California at Santa Cruz. He later completed a Masters at the Columbia University Graduate School of Journalism.

Career 
Scherer started his career as a reporter at Mother Jones before he was made Washington correspondent for Salon. He was recruited to join TIME in 2007 and was the magazine’s White House correspondent until he was promoted to Washington bureau chief in 2009. He moved to The Washington Post in 2017.

Scherer regularly appears on PBS' Washington Week and C-SPAN.

Awards 
Scherer won the National Press Club’s Lee Walczak Award for Political Excellence in 2012 for his work covering the Obama re-election campaign. In 2014, Scherer won the New York Press Club Award for Political Coverage for a cover story on the US government shutdown in 2013.

References

External links
 Michael Scherer on Twitter

Living people
The Washington Times people
The Washington Post journalists
Columbia University Graduate School of Journalism alumni
Mother Jones (magazine) people
Salon (website) people
Time (magazine) people
American male journalists
American newspaper journalists
Year of birth missing (living people)
21st-century American journalists